Ryžoviště (formerly Brunzejf) is a municipality and village in Bruntál District in the Moravian-Silesian Region of the Czech Republic. It has about 600 inhabitants.

Notable people
Norbert Klein (1866–1933), bishop of Brno, Grand Master of the Teutonic Order

References

Villages in Bruntál District